L 6 is a  sailboat class designed by A. Kiselev and built in about 110 copies, sailed in the Baltic and Black Sea.

References

1950s sailboat type designs
Sailboat type designs by Soviet designers
Keelboats